Generations is a jazz album by Bucky Pizzarelli and his son John Pizzarelli, released April 10, 2007. The album features performances by the father and son, a musical pairing of two guitarists who have worked with one another in studio and live events often before.

Track listing
 "Fred"3:49
 "Polka Dots and Moonbeams"5:32
 "Rose Room"3:58
 "Midnight Sun"5:23
 "A Sleepin' Bee"3:41
 "At Sundown"3:44
 "I'll Remember April"4:24
 "The Second Movement of Sonatina"2:44
 "Darn That Dream"3:34
 "Avalon"3:42
 "Early Autumn"6:00
 "Graham Avenue Stroll"4:48
 "How Long Has This Been Going On"4:33
 "The Way You Look Tonight"4:59
 "Variation and Fugue no.9 on 'La Folia'"1:28

Personnel
Bucky Pizzarelliguitar, leader
John Pizzarelliguitar

References

2007 albums
Bucky Pizzarelli albums
John Pizzarelli albums
Arbors Records albums
Collaborative albums